Synodontis macrops is a species of upside-down catfish endemic to Uganda where it is found in the Aswa River basin.  This species grows to a length of  TL.

References

External links
 
 

macrops
Freshwater fish of Africa
Fish of Uganda
Endemic fauna of Uganda
Taxa named by Humphry Greenwood
Fish described in 1963
Taxonomy articles created by Polbot